"Actions & Motives" is the third single by American alternative metal band 10 Years. It was released on their fourth studio album, and second major label release, Division. This song peaked at No. 36 on the Billboard Mainstream Rock Tracks chart.

Single release
On May 24, 2009, an EP for Actions & Motives was released. It has a promotional video for the song, a live, acoustic version of the track "Russian Roulette", along with "Actions & Motives" itself. On the band's MySpace blog, they stated it was an economic stimulus deal.

Track listing

References 

10 Years (band) songs
Songs written by Jesse Hasek
2008 songs
Song recordings produced by Rick Parashar
Universal Records singles